Al-Shabab Al-Basri Sport Club, is an Iraqi football team based in Al-Hussein district, Basra, that plays in Iraq Division Three.

Managerial history

  Alwan Musa

Honours

National
Iraq Division Two
Winners (1): 2018–19

See also 
 2020–21 Iraq FA Cup

References

External links
 Iraq Clubs- Foundation Dates
 Basra Clubs Union

Football clubs in Iraq
2016 establishments in Iraq
Association football clubs established in 2017
Football clubs in Basra
Basra